is the head coach of the Earth Friends Tokyo Z in the Japanese B.League.

Head coaching record

|-
| style="text-align:left;"|Osaka Evessa
| style="text-align:left;"|2013-14
| 52||24||28|||| style="text-align:center;"| 6th in Bj Western |||3||1||2||
| style="text-align:center;"|Lost in 1st round
|-
| style="text-align:left;"|Osaka Evessa
| style="text-align:left;"|2014-15
| 52||28||24|||| style="text-align:center;"| 5th in Bj Western |||2||0||2||
| style="text-align:center;"|Lost in 1st round
|-

References

1977 births
Living people

Earth Friends Tokyo Z coaches
Japanese basketball coaches
Osaka Evessa coaches
Sun Rockers Shibuya coaches